Davy Kiprotich Koech (alias DK) (born 21 August 1951) is a Kenyan scientist. He is currently the Chief Executive Officer Centre for Clinical & Molecular Sciences; Professor of Immunology & Molecular Medicine; Distinguished Professor, The Australian-Asian Institute of Civil Leadership.

Early life and education 
Koech was born on 21 August 1951 in a small village, Motero, Soliat Sub-Location of the Kericho County. His parents were Samuel Kipkoech (aka Kipruto) Mitei and Helen Mitei. He attended his early years of education at Soliat Primary School, some 4 kilometers from his home between 1956 and 1959 (Class 1-4) after which he proceeded to Sitotwet Intermediate School (now Torit School) (1960-1963) where he sat the Kenya African Preliminary Examination (KAPE) and then to Cheribo Primary School (1964) where he sat the Kenya Preliminary Education (KPE) exams.

His secondary education was undertaken at the Kericho High School where he sat the Ordinary Level of the University of Cambridge Local Examinations Syndicate. G.C.E. (Nov. 1968) and proceeded to Strathmore College where he sat for his University of London, General Certificate of Education, Advanced Level (Jan 1970) and further to the University of Nairobi completing in April 1974.

University education and related education 
Koech attended the University of Nairobi where he undertook a Bachelor of Science in Chemistry and Zoology completing in April 1974. He later went ahead to acquire a Master of Science in Pharmacology specializing in Clinical Pharmacology at Duquesne University, Pittsburgh, Pennsylvania, USA in 1977.

Koech has a PhD in Medical Pathology, Immunology from the University of Nairobi, Kenya; research undertaken at Harvard University Medical School, Boston, MA, USA in 1980.

He has served in various positions in the Government of Kenya and other different organizations in the private sector and international bodies.

Publications

 2019 Elliot D and Koech DK. Reimaging Science and Statecraft in Postcolonial Kenya. Routledge Taylor & Francis Group. UK. 2019; London, UK
 1999 Koech DK (Chairman). Totally Integrated Quality Education and Training [TIQET]. Report of the Commission of Inquiry into the Education System of Kenya. 1999; Nairobi, Kenya
 1996 Mungai JM and KOECH DK (Eds.). Demystifying AIDS in Africa. African Forum for Health Sciences. 1996; Nairobi, Kenya.
 1996 Mungai JM, Kofi-Tsekpo MW and KOECH DK (Eds.). Saving Africa from Drawing in Social Drugs. African Forum for Health Sciences. 1996; Nairobi, Kenya.
 1986 Kinoti SN, KOECH DK and Tukei PM (Eds.). Advances in the Diagnosis, Treatment and Prevention of Immunizable Diseases in Africa with a Symposium on AIDS: Proceedings of the Seventh KEMRI/KETRI Annual Medical Scientific Conference. 1986; Nairobi, Kenya.
 1985 Tukei PM, KOECH DK and Kinoti SN (Eds.). Recent Advances in the Management and Control of Infections in Eastern Africa: Proceedings of the Sixth Annual Scientific Conference, Nairobi, Kenya. KEMRI and KETRI. 1985; Nairobi, Kenya

Koech Commission 
Koech was appointed by the former president of the Republic of Kenya Daniel Toroitich arap Moi to head the Davy Koech Commission that formed an inquiry into Kenya's Education System in 1999.

Controversies 
In the 1990s, Koech, by then the Director of Kenya Medical Research Institute and Dr. Arthur O. Obel, the Chief Research Officer published in two medical journals the initial results of the new found drug   "Kemron" that was perceived from the preliminary study of 10 patients to cure AIDS. The drug was introduced in a public ceremony presided by Kenya's former President, Daniel Toroitch Arap Moi and the work of the new wonder drug discovered was hailed as a major step against AIDS and a win for African Science by the former Vice President and Finance Minister George Saitoti.

Kemron was the trade name for a low-dose of alpha interferon, manufactured form of a natural body chemical in a tablet form that dissolves in the mouth.

Clinical trials of Kemron funded by WHO in five African Countries did not find any health benefits reported by Kemri Scientists. Thereafter, WHO in a press release in its headquarters in Geneva, Switzerland termed Kemron as an experimental drug of unproved benefit for HIV/AIDS treatment.

The American National Institute of Health concluded that no one had been able to duplicate the effects claimed by scientists behind Kemron drug.

In September 2021, Davy Koech was found guilty of fraudulent acquisition of public property by Senior Principal Magistrate Victor Wakumile. The court fined Koech Ksh19.6 million which it added could be paid in two instalments failure to which he will serve a six-year jail term.

External links 

 Official Website
Davy Koech on twitter

References 



1951 births
Living people
Kenyan chief executives
Kenyan scientists
People from Kericho County
University of Nairobi alumni
Duquesne University alumni
Kenyan immunologists